Stan Foster is an American film, television, and stage producer, actor, writer and director from Youngstown, Ohio. He is most known for his role in the Tour of Duty TV series where he played Marvin Johnson.  He also wrote the play and film Woman Thou Art Loosed and wrote and directed the film Preacher's Kid (2010).

References

External links
 

Living people
Male actors from Youngstown, Ohio
American film directors
African-American male actors
Year of birth missing (living people)
21st-century African-American people